That's Black Entertainment is a 1989 documentary film starring African-American performers and featuring clips from black films from 1929–1957.

Film clips included
Many entertainers, along with their musical numbers, and the film they starred in, include:
Paul Robeson (Song of Freedom)
Bessie Smith (St. Louis Blues)
Eubie Blake, Nina Mae McKinney, and The Nicholas Brothers (Pie, Pie Blackbird)
Lena Horne (The Duke Is Tops)
Nat 'King' Cole and Moms Mabley (Killer Diller)
Sammy Davis, Jr. and Ethel Waters (Rufus Jones for President)
Cab Calloway (Cab Calloway's Jitterbug Party)
Ethel Waters (Carib Gold)

Not only musical clips were shown, but dramatic clips as well, like Murder in Harlem (1935), Juke Joint (1947), Four Shall Die (1940), and Souls of Sin (1949).

The film also includes clips from white films stereotyping blacks, including D.W. Griffith's The Birth of a Nation, 
and a blackfaced Bing Crosby in Crooner's Holiday (1932).

Celebrity appearances
Billie Allen
Louis Armstrong
Albert Ammons
Eubie Blake
Clarence Brooks
Cab Calloway
Nat 'King' Cole
Bing Crosby
Dorothy Dandridge
Sammy Davis, Jr.
Duke Ellington
Francine Everett
Stepin Fetchit
William Greaves
Alfred Hawkins
Billie Holiday
Lena Horne
Pete Johnson
July Jones
Moms Mabley
Nina Mae McKinney
Clarence Muse
The Nicholas Brothers
Jesse Owens
Paul Robeson
Frank 'Sugar Chile' Robinson
Bessie Smith
Fredi Washington
Ethel Waters
Spencer Williams

References

External links

1989 films
African-American films
Documentary films about Hollywood, Los Angeles
Documentary films about the cinema of the United States
Documentary films about African Americans
Compilation films
American documentary films
1980s American films